Cryptophleps is a genus of flies in the family Dolichopodidae.

Species

Cryptophleps atollensis Bickel, 1996
Cryptophleps buala Bickel, 2006
Cryptophleps bucculenta Bickel, 2006
Cryptophleps buttikeri Grichanov, 2015
Cryptophleps cyplus Bickel, 1996
Cryptophleps inornata Bickel, 1996
Cryptophleps izia (Negrobov, 1973)
Cryptophleps karkar Bickel, 2006
Cryptophleps kerteszi Lichtwardt, 1898
Cryptophleps minuta (Negrobov & Shamshev, 1986)
Cryptophleps namibica Grichanov, 2015
Cryptophleps nigrihalterata Lamb, 1922
Cryptophleps nova Bickel, 1996
Cryptophleps ochrihalterata Lamb, 1922
Cryptophleps papuana Grootaert & Meuffels, 1987
Cryptophleps rivularis Bickel, 2006
Cryptophleps rothii Couturier, 1978
Cryptophleps samoensis Bickel, 2006
Cryptophleps solomonis Bickel, 1996
Cryptophleps vaea Bickel, 2006
Cryptophleps vitiensis Bickel, 2006
Cryptophleps vivida (Negrobov & Shamshev, 1986)
Cryptophleps yungaburra Bickel, 1996

References

Dolichopodidae genera
Diaphorinae
Diptera of Europe
Diptera of Asia
Diptera of Africa
Diptera of Australasia